Johannes Cornelis Maria Veerman (born 19 November 1998) is a Dutch professional footballer who plays as a midfielder for Eredivisie club PSV Eindhoven.

Club career

Volendam
Veerman made his professional debut in the Eerste Divisie for FC Volendam on 9 September 2016, in a game against VVV-Venlo.

Heerenveen
On 30 August 2019, Veerman signed for SC Heerenveen in the Eredivisie. He made his Eredivisie debut a day after signing, coming on as a second-half substitute for fellow midfielder Jordy Bruijn in a 1–1 draw with Fortuna Sittard.

PSV
On 4 January 2022, Veerman signed a 4.5-year contract with PSV Eindhoven. Veerman scored the match winner against Go Ahead Eagles in the semi-final of the KNVB Cup on 2 March. PSV would defeat rivals Ajax in the final on 17 April. 

On 28 October 2022, Veerman scored PSV's first goal in a 2–0 win over Arsenal in the penultimate match of the UEFA Europa League group stage which secured a place in at least the knockout round play-offs.

Career statistics

Honours 
PSV
 KNVB Cup: 2021–22
 Johan Cruyff Shield: 2022

Individual
 Eredivisie Talent of the Month: February 2020

References

External links

 Profile at the PSV Eindhoven website
 

1998 births
People from Purmerend
Living people
Dutch footballers
Association football midfielders
Eredivisie players
Eerste Divisie players
Derde Divisie players
FC Volendam players
SC Heerenveen players
PSV Eindhoven players
Footballers from North Holland